Kamalnagar is an upazila of Lakshmipur District in the Division of Chittagong, Bangladesh.

Administration
Kamalnagar Upazila is divided into nine union parishads: Char Folcon, Char Kadira, Char Kalkini, Char Lawrench, Char Martin, Hajirhat, Patarirhat, Shaheberhat, and Torabgonj. The union parishads are subdivided into 33 mauzas and 33 villages.

See also
Upazilas of Bangladesh
Districts of Bangladesh
Divisions of Bangladesh

References

Upazilas of Lakshmipur District